Lauren Stephenson (born July 13, 1997) is an American professional golfer.

Amateur career
Stephenson played her college golf at Clemson University (one year) and the University of Alabama (two years).

She also competed at the 2018 Curtis Cup and the 2018 Arnold Palmer Cup.

Professional career
Stephenson turned professional in 2018 and finished T-8 at the LPGA Tour's Q-Series to earn her 2019 tour card. She made 11 cuts in 20 events in 2019 to retain her card. She finished tied for 9th at the 2020 Women's PGA Championship, qualifying her for the 2020 U.S. Women's Open. She is sponsored by Carlisle Companies.

Amateur wins
2012 Golf Pride Junior Classic
2013 TaylorMade-Adidas Junior All-Star at Chateau Elan, Hank Haney IJGA Junior Open
2014 AJGA Girls Championship
2015 Dixie Amateur
2016 Eastern Amateur Championship
2017 Mason Rudolph Championship
2018 Liz Murphy Collegiate Classic

Source:

Results in LPGA majors
Results not in chronological order before 2019 or in 2020.

CUT = missed the half-way cut
WD = withdrew
NT = no tournament
T = tied

LPGA Tour career summary

^ Official as of August 31, 2022
*Includes matchplay and other tournaments without a cut.

World ranking
Position in Women's World Golf Rankings at the end of each calendar year.

U.S. national team appearances
Amateur
Curtis Cup: 2018 (winners)
Arnold Palmer Cup: 2018 (winners)

Source:

References

External links

American female golfers
Clemson Tigers women's golfers
Alabama Crimson Tide women's golfers
LPGA Tour golfers
Golfers from South Carolina
Sportspeople from Greenville, South Carolina
People from Lexington, South Carolina
1997 births
Living people
20th-century American women
21st-century American women